In the US, an aircraft maintenance technician (AMT) is a tradesperson and also refers to a licensed technical qualification for carrying out aircraft maintenance. AMTs inspect and perform or supervise maintenance, preventive maintenance, repairs and alteration of aircraft and aircraft systems.

For a person who holds a mechanic certificate issued by the Federal Aviation Administration, the rules for certification, and for certificate-holders, are detailed in Subpart D of Part 65 of the Federal Aviation Regulations (FARs), which are part of Title 14 of the Code of Federal Regulations. The US licensed qualification is sometimes referred to by the FAA as the Aviation Maintenance Technician and is commonly referred to as the Airframe and Powerplant (A&P).

Certification
The general requirement for eligibility for a mechanic certificate include the following. The candidate must:

Be 18 or older
Be able to read, speak, and understand English fluently;
Meet the experience or educational requirement; and
Pass a set of required tests within a maximum of 24 months.

The required tests include a set of knowledge tests, followed by a practical test, which includes an oral examination component, and which is administered by a Designated Mechanic Examiner (DME).

A person who fulfills the necessary requirements is issued a mechanic certificate with either an airframe or powerplant rating, or both. These ratings together account for the common practice of referring to mechanics as "A&Ps."  Until 1952, instead of the Powerplant rating, an Engine rating was issued, so the abbreviation "A&E" may appear in older documents.

Eligibility for the mechanic tests depends on the applicant's ability to document their knowledge of required subject matter and ability to perform maintenance tasks.  The FAA recognizes two ways of demonstrating the needed knowledge and skills:  practical experience or completion of a training program at a school certificated under Part 147 of the FARs.

Industry competitions
The AMT Society presents the annual maintenance skills competition, which recognizes top AMT teams across all aviation including commercial and military.

Applications based on experience
Applicants for a mechanic certificate with a single rating—either airframe or powerplant—and who base their application on practical experience must demonstrate 18 months of work experience applicable to the chosen rating. Those applying for both ratings must show a total of 30 months of applicable experience. The United States military provides an opportunity to gain practical experience, and there is a simple process of obtaining eligibility from military experience to earn an Airframe and Powerplant License as long as the members careers meet the required career specialty codes or MOS.

Applications based on education
Applicants who attend an aviation maintenance school program certificated under Part 147 study an FAA-approved and supervised curriculum. Those applying for a mechanic certificate with a single rating—either airframe or powerplant—study a "general" set of subjects for at least 400 hours, as well as at least 750 hours of material appropriate to the chosen rating, for a total of 1,150 hours. Those who pursue both ratings study the "general" material, as well as the 750 hours for each rating, for a total of at least 1,900 hours. Completion of such a program of study typically requires between 18 and 24 months.

Required areas of study in the "general" curriculum include electricity, technical drawings, weight and balance, hydraulics and pneumatics, ground operation of aircraft, cleaning and corrosion control, basic mathematical calculations, forms and record-keeping, basic physics, maintenance manuals and publications, and applicable federal regulations.  Thorough knowledge of FAA rules and regulations (especially with regard to accepted repair/modification procedures) is also expected of A&P mechanics.

Required areas of study in the airframe curriculum include inspection, structures—wood, sheet metal, composite—and fasteners, covering, finishes, welding, assembly and rigging, hydraulics, pneumatics, cabin atmosphere control systems, instrument systems, communication and navigation systems, fuel systems, electrical systems, position and warning systems, ice and rain control systems, and fire protection systems.

Required areas of study in the powerplant curriculum include inspection, reciprocating and turbine engine theory and repair, instrument systems, fire protection systems, electrical systems, lubrication systems, ignition and starting systems, fuel metering systems, fuel systems, induction and airflow systems, cooling systems, exhaust and reverser systems, propellers, unducted fans, and auxiliary power units.

Inspection authorization 
Some AMTs, after at least three years of working in their field, choose to acquire an inspection authorization (IA), which is an additional rating added on to the individual's mechanic certificate. These individuals are allowed to perform annual inspections on aircraft and sign off for return to service on major repairs and alterations on the required block of the FAA form 337. Certification and limitations, including renewal requirements, of mechanics with inspection authorization is contained in 14 CFR Part 65.

The requirements for obtaining an inspection authorization is that the AMT must be licensed for a minimum of three years and actively exercising the rights of an A&P for the two years prior to the date that the IA examination is to be taken.

Renewal of the IA rating must be done every two years (on odd years) by submitting to the FAA a form showing a minimum of activity in which the IA exercised his or her authority. This activity comprises either annual inspections, major repairs, major alterations, or a minimum of 8 hours of FAA approved training. This activity must be accomplished every 12 months even though the renewal period is every 24 months.

Employment status 

 Training
There are 180 maintenance schools in the United States. In 2017 number of students was 18,000. The scholarship for students ranges from $2,500 to $16,000.

 Employment opportunity
In 2019 number of aircraft technicians was 292,002, only 2.4% were women. According to the 2019 report from Boeing North America will need 192,000 new technicians over the next 20 years.

 Wage level
The average annual income of aircraft maintenance personnel is $68,677 in the United States.

See also
Aircraft maintenance engineer (Canada)
Charles Taylor Master Mechanic Award

References

External links
How to become an aircraft mechanic and certification information
How to Earn Your A&P License With Military Experience

Computer Testing Supplement for Aviation Mechanic  General, Powerplant, and Airframe; and Parachute Rigger FAA 2005

 
Aviation licenses and certifications
Aviation in the United States
Technicians